, is a story written by Yukio Tsuchiya and originally published in Japan in 1951, was published and marketed as a true story of the elephants in Tokyo's Ueno Zoo during World War II. 

According to the picture book, the Japanese Army had requested that every zoo in Japan poison their large or dangerous animals because they were worried that these animals would escape and harm the general public if a bomb detonated near the zoo. The poison that worked on the other animals did not work on the three remaining Indian elephants, so they were starved to death. These elephants and the other animals killed are now commemorated at the zoo with a cenotaph. Tsuchiya wrote the book in order to let children know the grief, fear, and sadness caused by war. 

Youth Literature scholars, notably Professor Emeritus Kay E. Vandergrift, Rutgers, Department of Library and Information Science, have contested the claim that the story is factual, referring to it as "historical fiction for children". Dr. Betsy Hearne, University of Illinois at Urbana-Champaign, writes: “Certainly a story can be culturally confusing, as was Yukio Tsuchiya's The Faithful Elephants: A True Story of Animals, People, and War (1988), which turned out to be a legend, and a complex one at that.”

The story served as a major plot point in episode 5 of the anime adaptation of Mitsuboshi Colors.

References

External links
 Brief comparison of "Faithful Elephants" and the real events at Ueno Zoo

1951 children's books
Japanese books
Books about elephants
World War II in popular culture